Alberto Saavedra Muñoz (born 29 October 1981) is a Spanish footballer who plays as a central defender.

Football career
Born in Oviedo, Asturias, Saavedra's career began when he signed a professional contract with local Real Oviedo, making his first appearance with the first team in 2002. He never appeared in any La Liga games with the club, and moved to CD Numancia in the 2003–04 season; the Sorians promoted from the second division, but he did not feature one single minute during the half campaign, also being sparingly used by the reserves.

In January 2004, Saavedra moved to the Netherlands, signing a deal with Eredivisie participants ADO Den Haag and quickly becoming a first-team regular. He returned to his homeland in 2007, first with UD Vecindario then Ontinyent CF (both in the third level).

Personal life
Saavedra's older brother, Jesús María Martínez & José Jorge, also a stopper, also played briefly for Oviedo's first team, appearing in one top-flight match in 1998–99. His career, however, was spent largely in the lower leagues.

References

External links

Stats at Voetbal International 

1981 births
Living people
Footballers from Oviedo
Spanish footballers
Association football defenders
Segunda División players
Segunda División B players
Tercera División players
Real Oviedo Vetusta players
Real Oviedo players
CD Numancia B players
Marino de Luanco footballers
UD Vecindario players
Ontinyent CF players
Caudal Deportivo footballers
Eredivisie players
ADO Den Haag players
Spanish expatriate footballers
Expatriate footballers in the Netherlands
Spanish expatriate sportspeople in the Netherlands